From the Czech Mills (Z ceských mlýnu) is a 1941 Czechoslovak comedy film directed by Miroslav Cikán. It stars  Theodor Pištěk, Jindřich Plachta, and Svatopluk Beneš.

References

External links
 From the Czech Mills at the Internet Movie Database

1941 films
Czechoslovak comedy films
1941 comedy films
Films directed by Miroslav Cikán
Czechoslovak black-and-white films
1940s Czech films